Burning Fork is an unincorporated community located in Magoffin County, Kentucky, United States. The etymology of Burning Fork refers to a natural gas vein that was ignited and eventually extinguished by 1865.

References

Unincorporated communities in Magoffin County, Kentucky
Unincorporated communities in Kentucky